The 2021 FIBA 3x3 AmeriCup is the inaugural edition of the FIBA 3x3 Americup. It is the first-ever national team competition for 3x3 in the Americas. The game will be held from 12 November to 14 November in Miami, Florida, United States. Sixteen men's teams and 13 women's teams participated.

Participating teams
The winners from qualifying draw A and B is included in the Pools C and D, respectively. Numbers in the parentheses are seeds.

Men's

Women's

Format
Preliminary round is played as a round-robin format and top two teams from each pool advance to the quarterfinal.

Men's tournament

Qualifying draw

Draw A

Draw B

Pool stage

Pool A

Pool B

Pool C

Pool D

Knockout stage 
All times are local.

Final standings

Women's tournament

Qualifying draw

Pool stage

Pool A

Pool B

Pool C

Pool D

Knockout stage 
All times are local.

Final standings

References

External links
FIBA 3x3 Americup 2021

International basketball competitions hosted by the United States
FIBA 3x3 AmeriCup
FIBA 3x3 AmeriCup
FIBA 3x3 AmeriCup